Novoberezovka is a rural locality (a selo) and the administrative center of Novoberezovsky Selsoviet, Pervomaysky District, Altai Krai, Russia. The population was 421 as of 2013. There are 4 streets.

Geography 
Novoberezovka is located 70 km northeast of Novoaltaysk (the district's administrative centre) by road. Malaya Povalikha is the nearest rural locality.

References 

Rural localities in Pervomaysky District, Altai Krai